Hyökki is a Finnish surname. Notable people with the surname include:

 (born 1946), conductor of the YL Male Voice Choir
 (born 1970), son of Matti, conductor of the Tapiola Choir

Finnish-language surnames